Nawa Region is one of the 31 regions of Ivory Coast. Since its establishment in 2011, it has been one of three regions in Bas-Sassandra District. The seat of the region is Soubré and the region's population in the 2021 census was 1,165,472, making it the second-most populous region in Ivory Coast.

Nawa is currently divided into four departments: Buyo, Guéyo, Méagui, and Soubré.

Notes

 
Regions of Bas-Sassandra District
States and territories established in 2011
2011 establishments in Ivory Coast